Muhammad Amin Hassuna (1909–1956) was a 20th-century Egyptian writer, literary critic, and journalist. He published in Arabic literary and cultural magazines such as Arrissalah and Al-Hadith.

In the Al-Hadith magazine published in Aleppo, he had a dedicated column 1933-1934 entitled "In Egyptian Literature / Icons of the Modern School," in which he profiled notable figures in modern Arabic literature, including Ahmad Amin, Ahmed Rami, Ahmed Zaki Abu Shadi, Ahmed Khayri Sa'id, and Muhammad Taymur.

His articles in Arrissalah included pieces on Charles Langbridge Morgan's novel Portrait in a Mirror, Italian literature, and Luigi Pirandello.

Publications 
His first published book was Cubs of the Revolution.

He published a collection of short stories entitled White Rose with an introduction by Mahmud Taymur.

His book Beyond the Seas is of the rihla genre.

References 

1909 births
1956 deaths
Egyptian literary critics
Egyptian male writers